During the 2003–04 season, R.S.C. Anderlecht participated in the Belgian First Division.

Season summary
Anderlecht won the title for the first time in three seasons. They had held a big lead over their title rivals Club Brugge for some time, but a bad finish from Anderlecht kept the suspense until the 31st matchday, when Club Brugge drew with Mouscron while the team from Brussels also drew (1-1) at Lierse to confirm their title.

First-team squad

Left club during season

Results

Belgian First Division

Champions League

Second qualifying round

Anderlecht won 3–2 on aggregate.

Third qualifying round

Anderlecht won 4–1 on aggregate.

Group stage

References

Notes

2003-04
Belgian football clubs 2003–04 season
Belgian football championship-winning seasons